John F. Meister (May 10, 1863 – January 17, 1923) was an American baseball player. Meister played two seasons in Major League Baseball, 1886–87, for the New York Metropolitans, primarily as a second baseman.

He was listed in the Allentown, Pennsylvania directory of 1888 as a "professional" baseball player. He was the third son of Charles and Louisa Meister. After his baseball career was over, John Meister owned a liquor store, a tavern, and then a restaurant.

External links

John Meister statistics at Baseball Almanac

Major League Baseball second basemen
Major League Baseball center fielders
New York Metropolitans players
Meriden (minor league baseball) players
Waterbury (minor league baseball) players
Meriden Maroons players
Hartford Dark Blues (minor league) players
Hazleton (minor league baseball) players
Worcester Grays players
Lebanon (minor league baseball) players
Lebanon Cedars players
Binghamton Bingoes players
Rochester Flour Cities players
Allentown Colts players
Harrisburg Senators players
Sportspeople from Allentown, Pennsylvania
1863 births
1923 deaths
Baseball players from Pennsylvania
19th-century baseball players